Paraphernalia most commonly refers to a group of apparatus, equipment, or furnishing used for a particular activity. For example, an avid sports fan may cover their walls with football and/or basketball paraphernalia.

Historical legal term
In legal language, "paraphernalia" is a term of art from older family law. The word "paraphernalia" is plural, meaning "things beyond the dowry". Paraphernalia were the separate property of a married woman, such as clothing and jewellery "appropriate to her station", but excluding the assets that may have been included in her dowry.  The term originated in Roman law, but ultimately comes from Greek  (parápherna), "beyond (para) the dowry (phernē)".

These sorts of property were considered the separate property of a married woman under coverture.  A husband could not sell, appropriate, or convey good title to his wife's assets considered paraphernalia without her separate consent.  They did not become a part of her husband's estate upon his death, and could be conveyed by a married woman's will.

Changes in family law and inheritance law (mirroring trends in the wider society, such as the several Married Woman's Property Acts of the various common law jurisdiction), have generally rendered the legal concept of paraphernalia obsolete.

In fiction
The legal concept of paraphernalia in this sense is an important plot point in Anthony Trollope's novel The Eustace Diamonds. In the novel, it was a matter of some consequence whether the title jewelry was an heirloom, property of the heirs, or a woman's paraphernalia, freely alienable by her.

See also
 Drug paraphernalia
 Collecting
 Kit

References

Legal history
Family law
Roman law